Rongai Constituency is an electoral constituency in Kenya. It is one of eleven constituencies in Nakuru County. The constituency has eight wards, all electing councillors for the Nakuru County Assembly. The constituency was established for the 1988 elections when it was carved out of Nakuru North Constituency (now Subukia Constituency).

The first Rongai MP, previously representing Nakuru North, is a brother-in-law of then Kenyan president Daniel arap Moi.

Members of Parliament

Locations and wards

References

External links 
Map of the constituency

Constituencies in Nakuru County
Constituencies in Rift Valley Province
1988 establishments in Kenya
Constituencies established in 1988